The 2014 Davis Cup (also known as the 2014 Davis Cup by BNP Paribas for sponsorship purposes) was the 103rd edition of the tournament between national teams in men's tennis. The final took place between the 21–23 of November 2014 in Lille, France, with Switzerland winning the title for the first time, defeating hosts France in the final.

World Group

Seeds

Draw

Final

World Group play-offs

Date: 12–14 September

The eight losing teams in the World Group first round ties and eight winners of the Zonal Group I final round ties competed in the World Group play-offs for spots in the 2015 World Group.  The draw took place on April 8 in London, England.

Seeded teams

 
 
 
 
 
 
 
 

Unseeded teams

 
 
 
 
 
 
 
 

Note: Due to security concerns, the International Tennis Federation Board of Directors decided to move the World Group play-off ties originally scheduled to be held in Israel and Ukraine.  Israel and Ukraine exercised their option of nominating neutral venues for their ties against Argentina and Belgium, respectively.

Americas Zone

Group I

Seeds:
 
 

Remaining nations:

Draw

Group II

Seeds:
 
 
 
 

Remaining nations:

Draw

Group III

 – promoted to Group II in 2015

 – promoted to Group II in 2015

Asia/Oceania Zone

Group I

Seeds:
 
 

Remaining nations:

Draw

Group II

Seeds:
 
 
 
 

Remaining nations:

Draw

Group III

 
  – promoted to Group II in 2015
  – promoted to Group II in 2015
 
  – relegated to Group IV in 2015
 
 
  – relegated to Group IV in 2015

Group IV

 
 
 
 
 
 
 
 
  – promoted to Group III in 2015
  – promoted to Group III in 2015

Europe/Africa Zone

Group I

Seeds:
 
 
 
 

Remaining nations:

Draw

Group II

Seeds:
 
 
 
 
 
 
 
 

Remaining nations:

Draw

Group III Europe

 
 
 
 
  – promoted to Group II in 2015
 
 
 
 
 
 
  – promoted to Group II in 2015

Group III Africa

 
 
 
 
 
 
  – promoted to Group II in 2015
 
 
 
 
  – promoted to Group II in 2015

Note:  was suspended from Davis Cup competition for one year for violation of ITF rules, after the Tunisian Tennis Federation ordered Malek Jaziri not to play against Israeli opponent Amir Weintraub during the 2013 Tashkent Challenger, an ATP Challenger Tour event in October 2013.

See also
 2014 Fed Cup

References

External links

 
D
Davis Cups by year